Histamiini is a small horse which has become familiar from the television and Raili Mikkanen's children's books. Histamiini's most famous appearances are in the TV Christmas Calendar in 1980 and 1985. Histamiini's signature phrase is Klip-klop, klip-klop, hevonen on pop ("Clip-clop, clip-clop, a horse is pop").

Books
 Histamiini hukassa ("Histamiini is missing"), Otava, 1982
 Histamiinin hiihtoretki ("Histamiini's ski trip"), Otava, 1983
 Histamiini merellä ("Histamiini at sea"), Otava, 1984
 Histamiini ratsupoliisina ("Histamiini as a mounted policeman"), Otava, 1985
 Histamiini löytää timantin ("Histamiini finds a diamond"), Otava, 1986
 Histamiinista tulee kummi ("Histamiini becomes a godfather"), Otava, 1988
 Histamiini, joulun sankari ("Histamiini, the hero of Christmas"), Tammi, 2001
 Histamiini rakentaa lautan ("Histamiini builds a barge"), Tammi, 2003 (Keltanokkasarja)
 Ystävämme Histamiini ("Our friend Histamiini"), Tammi, 2004

External links
 Histamiini Christmas Calendar at the YLE archive
 Histamiini and Pirpo, secret mounted policemen at the YLE archive
 Histamiini and the mermaid's treasure at the YLE archive

Fictional horses
Finnish children's literature
Finnish children's television series
Television shows featuring puppetry